Mõttus is an Estonian surname (meaning "capercaillie"), and may refer to:
 Jaan Mõttus (1891–1942), Estonian politician
 Alfred Julius Mõttus (1886–1942), Estonian politician

References

Estonian-language surnames